Saint Andrew is a parish, situated in the southeast of Jamaica in the county of Surrey. It lies north, west and east of Kingston, and stretches into the Blue Mountains. In the 2011 census, it had 573,369, the highest population of any of the parishes in Jamaica. George William Gordon (d. 1865), one of Jamaica's seven National Heroes, was born in this parish.

It contains many attractions, historical sites, famous residents, and the country's financial capital.

The parish has a rich musical tradition, with numerous well-known musicians and developing popular types of Jamaican music. The Studio One studio founded by Clement "Coxsone" Dodd is in Saint Andrew. Mavado, Sean Paul, Buju Banton, Elephant Man, The Mighty Diamonds, Monty Alexander, Beres Hammond, Lady Saw, Sugar Minott, Bounty Killer, Mr. Vegas, Richie Spice are some of the parish's current musician residents.

The area of Trenchtown became famous for such residents as The Wailers (Bunny Wailer, Peter Tosh and Bob Marley), and Toots Hibbert, who created reggae music. Waterhouse is another hometown to many musicians, including Keith Hudson, King Tubby's, U Roy, Sir Jammy's, Black Uhuru, Dennis "Senitor" Allen, Early B. Super Cat, Shabba, and Beenie Man. It is also the home of Olympic gold medalist, Shelly-Ann Fraser-Pryce.

The residence built in 1881 by George Stiebel, Jamaica's first black millionaire, is known as Devon House. Steibel gained his wealth in Venezuela and returned to Jamaica. He was appointed as the Custos, a high civic post, of Saint Andrew.  His residence has been restored and is operated as a house museum; it is open to the public for tours and special events. Concessions include a Devon House ice cream shop.

The grounds of the Hope Estate, built in the 17th century, now support Hope Gardens (Royal Botanical Gardens), one of the oldest in the Western Hemisphere. The University of the West Indies is located on the estate and uses some of the historic buildings. Part of the navigable aqueduct is still intact.

Vale Royal, the residence of the Prime Minister, and King's House, the Governor General's residence, are significant historic buildings.

The area of Norbrook was once the plantation of George William Gordon. The Bob Marley Museum is located in a mansion on Hope Road that was once owned by businessman Chris Blackwell. It is now open for guided tours.

Geography
St. Andrew was one of the first parishes to be established by law in 1867. Before being established, it was known as  Liguanea.

The parish lies just north of Kingston, bounded in the west by St. Catherine, north by St. Mary, northeast by Portland along the Blue Mountain range, and east by St. Thomas. In 1923, the parishes of St Andrew and Kingston were administratively merged to form the Kingston and St Andrew Corporation (KSAC), with a single elected council and a mayor. Parts of the geographic area of Saint Andrew is often referred to as the "Corporate Area, town, Kingston Metropolitan area, uptown Kingston, Kingston 2-20". The current mayor of KSAC is Delroy Williams. St Andrew has one major river, that being the Hope River at 19.6 Kilometres

Cross Roads, New Kingston, Half-Way-Tree, Matilda's Corner, and Constant Spring are important commercial centres in St. Andrew, but may be regarded as suburbs of Kingston. Coronation Market bordering both Saint Andrew and Kingston, is one of the largest, if not the largest outdoor market in this part of the island provides a venue for farmers throughout Jamaica. West St. Andrew, however, is a populous residential area. Total population of the parish was 573,369 in 2011.

Notable people

Alexander Aikman (1755-1838) King's Printer, member House of Assembly
Monty Alexander
Maurice Ashley, Chess grandmaster hall-of-famer
Assassin(dj)/ Agent Sasco(dj)
Buju Banton, Jamaican musician
Alexander Bedward (1859-1930)
Beenie Man
Elephant Man
Lady Colin Campbell, author and socialite
Linford Christie, British athlete
Desmond Dekker (aka Desmond Dacres), reggae ska singer
Clement Dodd, Studio One music studio
Brian Fowler, racing driver
Ricardo Gardner
Di Genius
Andre Gordon, actor and producer
Fitzroy Gordon, Jamaican-Canadian radio executive and broadcaster
George William Gordon, Jamaican national hero, businessman, and politician
Gyptian, musician
Beverly Hall, educational administrator
Dorothy Henriques-Wells (1926–2018), painter and art teacher
Euan Lucie-Smith, WWI army officer of mixed heritage
Bob Marley, Trenchtown, Hope Road, Bull Bay
Mavado, Jamaican DJ
Judy Mowatt
Nyla, singer
Augustus Pablo, Jamaican musician
Sean Paul, Jamaican musician
Lee "Scratch" Perry
Hermine E. Ricketts (1956–2019), Jamaican-born American architect
Sanchez
Shaggy, Jamaican musician
Sizzla
Richie Spice
The Wailers
U Roy
Leslyn Lewis

Economy
Much of the parish is devoted to agriculture. Its principal products include coffee, mangoes, cocoa, peas, beans, sugarcane, cattle, dairy goods, cigar and cigarette, vegetables and ground provisions. To encourage the movement of industrial plants from the business areas of Kingston, and to facilitate the establishment of new industries with local and overseas capital, the government has established an industrial estate in St. Andrew, bordering on Western Kingston. This industrial estate is over 1.2 km2 (300 acres) in size.

Tourism plays a major part in the economy of the parish.  The major hotels in this southeastern part of the country can be found on Knutsford Boulevard, also known as The Strip. The area of New Kingston is seen as the financial capital of the island, with its large headquarters for banks and investment companies. The commercial areas, with their many malls, plazas and stores, provide employment for many in the urban area of the parish.
Gypsum is found in large quantities, in eastern St. Andrew, the largest deposits being in the area of Bull Bay, a mile and a half of the coast.

At the south of Papine, several miles northeast of Kingston is the University of the West Indies, occupying  of the Liguanea Plain at the foot of Long Mountain. The University of Technology, Jamaica, formerly the College of Arts, Science and Technology, is located nearby. So too is the United Theological College of the West Indies. The Edna Manley School for the Visual Arts is also located in Saint Andrew, not far from the National Stadium.

The parish of Saint Andrew also has some of the top high schools on the island. Campion College, Jamaica College, Calabar High School, Ardenne High School, Immaculate Conception High School, St Andrew High School for Girls, Holy Childhood High School, Meadowbrook High School, St. George's College, St Hugh's High School, Excelsior High School, and a campus of Kingston College, in Rollington Town, are some of those schools.

Saint Andrew provides the vibrancy that creates a city environment, nightlife, many restaurants, outdoor facilities, and tourist attractions, making the city of Kingston what it is today.

Government and infrastructure
The St. Andrew Juvenile Remand Centre of the Department of Correctional Services, Jamaica is located in Stony Hill, St. Andrew Parish.

Transportation

Road

The primary roads through Kingston to the rest of the island all pass through St Andrew including the A1 to Lucea, A3 to Saint Ann's Bay, A4 to Annotto Bay and B1 to Buff Bay via Newcastle.
The Transport Center, located in Half-Way-Tree, Saint Andrew is a depot for public buses servicing many parts of the tri-parish area (Saint Andrew, Kingston and Saint Catherine)and the outlying areas.

Rail

The main railway line from Kingston to the rest of the island ran through western St Andrew en route to Spanish Town. It is now closed.

Air
Jamaica's 2 primary airports are Sangster International Airport located in Montego Bay, St James and Norman Manley International Airport located on the Palisadoes Peninsula in Kingston, St. Andrew.

Sea
Plumb Point Lighthouse is located at Great Plumb Point on the Palisadoes Peninsula.

Important places
The Governor General's Residence at King House
Vale Royal, The Prime Minister's Residence,
 Modern commercial New Kingston Complex
Bob Marley Museum
 Sabina Park
The National Stadium
Mico College
Hope Garden
Half Way Tree
Cross Road
Carib Theatre
Saint Andrew Parish Church
Emancipation Park
Mandela Park
May Pen Cemetery
Strawberry Hill
Studio One
Trenchtown
New Kingston
The University of the West Indies, Mona Campus
Jamaica House
Edna Manley School of the Visual Arts
Temple Hall
New Castle

Towns, communities and villages

 Arnett Gardens
 Allman Town
 August Town (named for Emancipation Day, 1 August)
 Barbican
 Beverly Hills
 Bumper Hall
 Bull Bay
 Callaloo Bed
 Cassia Park
 Constant Spring
 Cassava Piece
 Chancery Heights
 Cherry Gardens
 Cypress Hall
 Cockburn Penn
 Cooper's Hill
 Denham Town
 Duhaney Park
 Drew's Land
 Elliston Flat
 Fletcher's Land
 Franklin Town
 Golden Spring
 Gordon Town
 Grant's Pen
 Greenwich Town
 Guava Gap
 Hannah Town
 Harbor View
 Havendale
 Independence Park
 Irish Town
 Jacks Hill
 Jungle
 Jones Town
 Kingweston
 King Wood
 Lawrence Tavern
 Manning's Hill
 Marverly
 Meadowbrook
 Mount James, Saint Andrew
 Mount Salus
 Nannyville
 New Kingston
 New Castle
 Norbrook
 Olympic Gardens
 Paine Land
 Patrick City
 Pear Hill
 Pembroke Hall
 Papine
 Queensbury
 Red Gal Ring
 Rollington Town
 Riverton City
 Rockfort
 Seaview Gardens
 Shooters Hill, Jamaica
 Six Miles
 Smoky Vale
 Stony Hill
 Strawberry Hill
 Tinson Pen
 Tivoli Gardens
 Trenchtown
 Tower Hill
 Temple Hall
 Unity
 Vineyard Town
 Washington Garden
 Waterhouse
 Warekia Hill
 Whitehall
 Wilton Garden
 Ziadie Gardens

References

External links
 Kingston and St. Andrew Corporation website
 Statistics

 
Parishes of Jamaica
1867 establishments in the British Empire